Michael Wise (1648–1687) was an English organist and composer. He sang as a child in the choir of the Chapel Royal and served as a countertenor in St George's Chapel, Windsor, from 1666 until, in 1668, he was appointed organist and choirmaster at Salisbury Cathedral. In 1676 he became a Gentleman of the Chapel Royal, and in the last year of his life was Master of the Children at St Paul's Cathedral.

He was killed during a confrontation with a Salisbury night watchman:

"He had quarrelled with his wife on some trivial matter, and rushed out of his house. The watchman met him while he was yet boiling with rage, and commanding him to stand and give an account of himself, he struck the guardian of the peace to the ground, who in return aimed a blow at his assailant with his bill, which broke his skull, of the consequence whereof he died."

Music
As well as Service Settings, his compositions include anthems such as:
How are the mighty fallen
Awake up, my glory
The ways of Zion do mourn
Blessed is he that considereth the poor and needy
Prepare ye the way of the Lord
Awake, put on thy strength

A number of movements within the jubilant Prepare ye the way of the Lord were parodied by George Frederic Handel in the oratorio Messiah.

Wise also composed some catches and at least one once famous drinking song, Old Chiron.

He often composed for the unusual combination of a duet of bass and treble voices – for instance, in Old Chiron and The Ways of Zion do mourn.

The choir of Gonville and Caius College, Cambridge issued a CD of Wise's Sacred Choral Music in 2008.

References

External links

Wise, Michael
Video recording of 'Blessed is he that considereth the poor and needy' sung by the Choir of Somerville College, Oxford

1648 births
1687 deaths
17th-century English composers
English Baroque composers
English classical composers
English classical organists
British male organists
Cathedral organists
Gentlemen of the Chapel Royal
17th-century classical composers
English male classical composers
Children of the Chapel Royal
17th-century male musicians
Male classical organists